The 1804 Massachusetts gubernatorial election was held on April 2.

Federalist Governor Caleb Strong was re-elected to a fifth consecutive one-year term in office, defeating Democratic-Republican James Sullivan.

General election

Results

References

Governor
1804
Massachusetts
April 1804 events